Virštanj is a settlement in the Municipality of Podčetrtek in eastern Slovenia. It is best known as a wine-producing area. It was traditionally part of the Styria region and is now included in the Savinja Statistical Region.

References

External links
Virštanj on Geopedia

Populated places in the Municipality of Podčetrtek